Arisil Kilar (Tamil: அரிசில் கிழார்) was a Tamil poet of Sangam period. He has authored 20 verses in the Sangam literature, including verse 13 of the Tiruvalluva Maalai.

Biography
Arisil Kilar hailed from Ariyilur and belonged to the Vellalar caste. His name was prefixed with "Arisil" since he lived on the banks of river Arisil near Kumbakonam. He was from the period of the last seven great patrons of the Tamil land. The King Thagadur Erindha Perum Cheral Irumporai bestowed 900,000 kaanam as prize upon him for writing ten verses of the Pathitrupatthu, and also made him a minister in his court. He is also believed to have penned verses of the Thagadur Yathrai. He is a contemporary of Kapilar, Paranar, Perunkunrur Kilar and Ponmudiyar. He is also known for his kindness act when he helped king Vaiyāvik Kōpperum Pēkan reunite with his wife.

Contribution to the Sangam literature
Arisil Kilar has written twenty Sangam verses in all, including seven in Purananuru, one in Kurunthogai, ten in Pathitrupatthu, one in Thagadur Yaathirai, and one (verse 13) of the Tiruvalluva Maalai.

Views on Valluvar and the Kural
Arisil Kilar opines about Valluvar and the Kural text thus:

See also

 Sangam literature
 List of Sangam poets
 Tiruvalluva Maalai

Notes

References

 
 
 
 
 
 

Tamil philosophy
Tamil poets
Scholars from Tamil Nadu
Tiruvalluva Maalai contributors
Sangam poets